The Japanese Village in Knightsbridge, London, was a late Victorian era exhibition of Japanese culture located in Humphreys' Hall, which took place from January 1885 until June 1887. The exhibition employed around 100 Japanese men and women in a setting built to resemble a traditional Japanese village.

Description
The exhibition was a commercial venture organised by Tannaker Buhicrosan (1839–1894), who had been organising travelling Japanese exhibitions in Britain for several years beforehand.  As a result of the opening up of Japan to trade with Britain in the 1850s, an English craze for all things Japanese had built through the 1860s and 1870s, fed by the British perception of Japan as a mediaeval culture.  This resonated particularly with devotees of the Aesthetic movement of the late nineteenth century and made the exhibition very popular, with over 250,000 visitors during its early months.

The exhibition was built to resemble a traditional Japanese village, completely contained within Humphreys' Hall (which was south of Knightsbridge and east of what is now Trevor Street). It employed around 100 Japanese men and women, and included segregated sleeping accommodation. According to advertisements placed in the Illustrated London News, "Skilled Japanese artisans and workers (male and female) will illustrate the manners, customs, and art-industries of their country, attired in their national and picturesque costumes. Magnificently decorated and illuminated Buddhist temple.  Five o’clock tea in the Japanese tea-house. Japanese Musical and other Entertainments. Every-day Life as in Japan".

While Gilbert and Sullivan were writing their opera The Mikado (1885), W. S. Gilbert visited the exhibition and engaged Japanese people from the village to teach his cast aspects of Japanese behaviour.  In May 1885, the hall burnt down overnight and one of the Japanese employees was killed in the blaze.  However Mr Buhicrosan immediately announced that the hall and the exhibit would be rebuilt as quickly as possible.  As it happened the exhibit employees were already committed to visit Berlin and appear at the 1885 International Hygiene Exhibition in Berlin. They proceeded to fulfill the engagement. Meanwhile, the hall and the village exhibit were both reconstructed and the exhibition re-opened to the public in December 1885 with "several streets of shops ... two temples and various free-standing idols, and a pool spanned by a rustic bridge".

The exhibition continued for another eighteen months. By February 1887, over a million people had visited it.  It closed in June 1887.

Notes

References

External links
Cultural Appropriation or Swiftian Satire? Gilbert and Sullivan’s The Mikado

Exhibitions in the United Kingdom
1880s in London
Victorian culture
Japanese culture
Events in London